Broadcast Film Critics Association Awards 2005 may refer to:

 10th Critics' Choice Awards, the tenth Critics' Choice Awards ceremony that took place in 2005
 11th Critics' Choice Awards, the eleventh Critics' Choice Awards ceremony that took place in 2006 and which honored the best in film for 2005